The North Carolina Council of State elections of 2012 were held November 6, 2012 to select the nine officers of the North Carolina Council of State. This election coincided with the U.S. presidential election, U.S. House elections, the gubernatorial election and the statewide judicial elections. Primary elections were held on May 8, 2012; for races in which no candidate received 40 percent of the vote in the primary, runoff elections (officially known as "second" primaries) were held on July 17.

The nine members of the North Carolina Council of State are statewide-elected officers serving four-year terms. In the 2012 elections, all incumbents who ran for new terms were re-elected, while the Lieutenant Governor's seat was open following incumbent Walter Dalton's decision to run for governor. The partisan makeup of the Council of State changed from 7 Democrats (8 including the governor) and 2 Republicans before the election to 6 Democrats and 3 Republicans (4 including the governor) afterward.

Governor

Republican Pat McCrory was elected governor.

Lieutenant governor

Republican Dan Forest was elected lieutenant governor.

Attorney general

Roy Cooper, the Democratic incumbent attorney general, ran for re-election unopposed.

Results

Secretary of State

Democratic primary
Elaine Marshall, the Democratic incumbent Secretary of State, ran for re-election.

Republican primary
Michael Beitler, business professor; Libertarian nominee for US Senator in 2010 (changed his registration to Republican to run for Secretary of State)
A.J. Daoud, business owner
Kenn Gardner, former Wake County commissioner
Ed Goodwin, Chowan County commissioner, retired Naval Criminal Investigative Service agent

Polling

Primary results

As no candidate received 40 percent of the vote, state law allows the runner-up to request a second primary (or "runoff"). Gardner requested a runoff.

General election

Polling

Results

State Auditor

Democratic primary
Beth A. Wood, the Democratic incumbent State Auditor, ran for re-election.

Republican primary
Joseph Hank DeBragga, auditor for North Carolina Department of Environment and Natural Resources
Greg Dority, three-time congressional candidate, Beaufort County Republican Party chairman
Debra Goldman, Wake County School Board member
Fern Shubert, former state senator, former state representative, certified public accountant
Rudy Wright, Mayor of Hickory, former certified public accountant

Polling

Primary results

As the runner-up, Dority chose not to request a runoff, making Goldman the nominee.

General election

Polling

Results

State Treasurer

Democratic primary
Janet Cowell, the Democratic incumbent State Treasurer, ran for re-election.
Ron Elmer, investment consultant

Polling

Primary results

Republican primary
Frank Roche, talk radio host
Steve Royal, certified public accountant

Polling

Primary results

General election

Polling

Results

Superintendent of Public Instruction

Democratic primary
June Atkinson, the Democratic incumbent Superintendent, ran for re-election.

Withdrawn Candidates
Rick Glazier, state representative

Republican primary
Richard Alexander, South Carolina teacher and former small business owner
Mark Crawford, former state representative
Ray Martin, teacher
David Scholl, businessman and Union County School Board member
John Tedesco, Wake County School Board member

Polling

Primary results

As the runner-up, Alexander requested a runoff.

General election

Polling

Results

Commissioner of Agriculture

Republican primary
Bill McManus, real estate investor, former attorney and accountant, former Democratic member of Massachusetts House of Representatives
Steve Troxler, the Republican incumbent Commissioner, ran for re-election.

Polling

Primary results

Democratic primary
Scott Bryant, farmer and former law enforcement officer
Walter Smith, farmer, former USDA official, former mayor of Boonville

Polling

Primary results

General election

Polling

Results

Commissioner of Labor

Republican primary
Cherie Berry, the Republican incumbent Commissioner, ran for re-election.

Democratic primary
John C. Brooks, former Commissioner of Labor
Marlowe Foster, public affairs director for Pfizer (registered lobbyist), former Winston-Salem State University official
Ty Richardson, 2008 candidate

Polling

Primary results

As the runner-up, Foster requested a runoff.

General election

Polling

Results

Commissioner of Insurance

Democratic primary
Wayne Goodwin, the Democratic incumbent Commissioner, ran for re-election.

Republican primary
Mike Causey, former lobbyist
James McCall, insurance agent
Richard T. Morgan, former state representative

Polling

Primary results

As the runner-up, Causey requested a runoff. Of all the statewide runoffs held on July 17, the Republican primary for Insurance Commissioner was the only one in which the top vote-getter changed from the first to the second primary.

General election

Polling

See also
North Carolina Council of State elections: 1996, 2000, 2004, 2008.

References

External links
NC State Board of Elections

Council of State
2012
North Carolina Council of State